Farmers Mills is a hamlet in Putnam County, in the U.S. state of New York.

History
Farmers Mills was named for the mill which operated at the site, serving farmers of the area. A post office operated under the Farmers Mills name from 1841 until 1923. A variant name was "Milltown".

References

Hamlets in New York (state)
Hamlets in Putnam County, New York